Mahlstedt's Ice Pond, commonly referred to as Huguenot Lake, is a man-made lake located in central New Rochelle in Westchester County, New York. Constructed in 1885, the lake is impounded by the Mahlstedt Reservoir Dam on a tributary of Pine Brook.

For years the lake served as a water supply source for nearby Mount Vernon as well as a successful ice supply business.
Several generations of the Mahlstedt family harvested ice from the lake, however, after refrigeration made the once-lucrative business obsolete, the family sold the lake and adjoining property to the city in 1922. The lake is currently part of Huguenot Park and the New Rochelle High School campus. It is currently used for recreational and environmental purposes.

Freshwater wetland and stream restoration
A restoration project on the extended campus grounds of New Rochelle High School was completed to stabilize the eroding banks along Stephenson Brook. The banks were regraded,  biodegradable support structures were installed for additional support, and the area was planted with perennials, shrubs and trees to purify the water and keep the banks permanently stabilized. Upland vegetation was also added along the shoreline of Huguenot Lake to control erosion and enhance habitat for wildlife. Yellow Iris, Blue Flag Iris, and reindeer moss were added because they naturally filter pollutants including nitrogen and phosphorus, as well as enhancing the aesthetics of the lake's shoreline.

References

Geography of New Rochelle, New York
Reservoirs in New York (state)
1885 establishments in New York (state)